Cool Suresh is an Indian actor who works in Tamil-language films. He is known for his comedic and negative roles.

Career 
Suresh made his debut with Chocolate (2001) where he portrayed the role of a thug of misbehaves with a thug and upon seeing his actions the hero (Prashanth) gets angered. He played similar roles in Kaakha Kaakha (2003) and Devathaiyai Kanden (2005). He acted as a playboy in  Thiruda Thirudi . He went on to play comedic roles including Singam Puli (2011) with Santhanam. He made his lead film debut with  the horror-comedy Padithavudan Kilithu Vidavum (2018). He will also play the lead role in Chithirame Solladi, an investigative thriller. Cool Suresh is also producing a film starring Julie of Bigg Boss Tamil fame. He is also set to star in T. Rajender's Indraya Kaadhal Da.
On October 2 2020, International Human Peace University Honored Cool Suresh with Honorary Doctorate for his social service to society.

Filmography

Films

Television 
Uravugal (2009 - 2012)
Athu Ithu Yethu (2012)
Genes (2018)
Thaaya Tharama
Thillu Mullu (2019)
Maanaadu Movie launch

References

External links 

Cool Suresh on Moviebuff

Living people
Indian male film actors
Indian male comedians
Tamil comedians
Male actors in Tamil cinema
Year of birth missing (living people)